The Chinese semiconductor industry, including integrated circuit design and manufacturing, forms a major part of mainland China's information technology industry.

China's semiconductor industry consists of a wide variety of companies, from integrated device manufacturers to pure-play foundries, fabless semiconductor companies and OSAT companies. Integrated device manufacturers (IDMs) design and manufacture integrated circuits. Pure-play foundries only manufacture devices for other companies, without designing them, while fabless semiconductor companies only design devices. Examples of Chinese IDMs are YMTC and CXMT, examples of Chinese pure-play foundries are SMIC, Hua Hong Semiconductor and Wingtech, examples of Chinese fabless companies are Zhaoxin, HiSilicon and UNISOC, and examples of Chinese OSAT companies are JCET, Huatian Technology and Tongfu Microelectronics.

Overview
China is currently the world’s largest semiconductor market in terms of consumption. In 2020, China represented 53.7% of worldwide chip sales, or $239.45 billion out of $446.1 billion. However, a large percentage are imported from multinational suppliers. In 2020, imports took up 83.38% ($199.7 billion) of total chip sales. In response, the country has launched a number of initiatives to close the gap, including investing $150 billion into its domestic IC industry through avenues like the National Integrated Circuit Industry Investment Fund (CICF), with a “Made in China 2025” goal of 70% domestic production.

China leads the world in terms of number of new fabs under construction, with 8 out of 19 worldwide in 2021, and 17 fabs in total are expected to start construction from 2021 to 2023. Total installed capacity of Chinese-owned chipmakers will also increase from 2.96 million wafers per month (wpm) in 2020 to 3.572 million wpm in 2021.

Due to the rapid pace of Chinese semiconductor industry advances, on October 7, 2022, the U.S. government announced a major set of export restrictions toward China, with a focus on artificial Intelligence and semiconductor technologies, with the aim of disrupting the development of China's semiconductor industry. In January 2023, these export controls were made multilateral with an agreement between the governments of the United States, Japan, and the Netherlands.

Foreign companies

There is a large number of foreign semiconductor companies operating fabrication plants and design facilities in China, including the largest companies such as SK Hynix, TSMC, Samsung, UMC, Texas Instruments, Micron and until 2021, Intel. Currently, the most advanced foreign made node in mainland China is 16 nm manufactured by TSMC in Nanjing.

Samsung, who is currently the world's largest producer of NAND flash memory, has two plants in Xi'an which accounts for 42.5% percent of its total production capacity, and 15.3% of worldwide NAND production capacity. It was the company's largest overseas investment in chip production with an initial cost of $7 billion.

Domestic companies

Integrated Device Manufacturers (IDMs)

Yangtze Memory Technologies Corp (YMTC)

Yangtze Memory Technologies Corp (YMTC) is a Chinese semiconductor integrated device manufacturer specializing in flash memory (NAND) chips. Founded in Wuhan, China in 2016, the company received backing from Tsinghua Unigroup. Prior to YMTC, China had no company capable of producing flash memory. Its consumer products are marketed under the brand Zhitai.

As of 2020, YMTC is using a 20 nm process to make 64-layer 3D NAND flash. In April 2020, the company unveiled its first 128 layers vertical NAND chip, currently the most advanced layer count in mass production, based on XTacking architecture, which has since entered production.

As of 2021, YMTC is producing around 80,000 wafers per month, with plans to expand its first plant to reach 100,000 wpm capacity by 2022, which would give it around 6-8% of global market share.

ChangXin Memory Technologies (CXMT)

ChangXin Memory Technologies (CXMT) is a Chinese semiconductor integrated device manufacturer headquartered in Hefei, Anhui specializing in the production of DRAM memory.

As of 2020, ChangXin can manufacture LPDDR4 and DDR4 RAM on a 19 nm process with a capacity of 40,000 wafers per month. The company plans to increase output to 120,000 wpm and launch 17 nm (LP)DDR5 by end of 2022, with a target total capacity of 300,000 wpm in the mid-long term.

Pure-play foundries

Semiconductor Manufacturing International Corporation (SMIC)

Semiconductor Manufacturing International Corporation (SMIC) is a partially state-owned publicly-listed Chinese pure-play semiconductor foundry company. It is the largest contract chip maker in mainland China and 5th largest globally, with a market share of 5.3% in 2Q21.

SMIC is headquartered in Shanghai and incorporated in the Cayman Islands. It has wafer fabrication sites throughout mainland China, offices in the United States, Italy, Japan, and Taiwan, and a representative office in Hong Kong.  It provides integrated circuit (IC) manufacturing services on 350 nm to 14 nm process technologies. State-owned civilian and military telecommunications equipment provider Datang Telecom Group as well as the China National Integrated Circuit Industry Investment Fund are major shareholders of SMIC.

Hua Hong Semiconductor

Hua Hong Semiconductor Limited is a publicly-listed Chinese pure-play semiconductor foundry company based in Shanghai, established in 1996 as part of China’s national efforts to boost its IC industry. Currently, Hua Hong’s most advanced node is achieved by its subsidiary Shanghai Huali (HLMC), which can manufacture 28/22-nm process and is currently developing advanced 14-nm technology.

It is currently mainland China's second largest chip-maker behind rival SMIC and 6th largest globally, with a market share of 2.6% in 2Q21.

Other companies
Nexchip
Wingtech Technology

Fabless companies

Zhaoxin

Zhaoxin is a fabless semiconductor company, created in 2013 as a joint venture between VIA Technologies and the Shanghai Municipal Government. The company manufactures x86-compatible desktop and laptop CPUs. The term Zhào xīn means million core. The processors are created mainly for the Chinese market: the venture is an attempt to reduce the Chinese dependence on foreign technology.

HiSilicon

HiSilicon is a Chinese fabless semiconductor company based in Shenzhen, Guangdong and wholly owned by Huawei. HiSilicon purchases licenses for CPU designs from ARM Holdings, including the ARM Cortex-A9 MPCore, ARM Cortex-M3, ARM Cortex-A7 MPCore, ARM Cortex-A15 MPCore, ARM Cortex-A53, ARM Cortex-A57 and also for their Mali graphics cores. HiSilicon has also purchased licenses from Vivante Corporation for their GC4000 graphics core.

HiSilicon is reputed to be the largest domestic designer of integrated circuits in China. In 2020, the U.S. instituted rules that require American firms providing certain equipment to HiSilicon or non-American firms who use American technologies that supply HiSilicon to have licenses and Huawei announced it will stop producing its Kirin chipset from 15 September 2020, onwards. HiSilicon has since been overtaken by Chinese rival UNISOC in terms of mobile processor market share.

UNISOC

UNISOC is a Chinese fabless semiconductor company headquartered in Shanghai which produces chipsets for mobile phones. UNISOC develops its business in two major fields - consumer electronics and industrial electronics, including smart phones, feature phones, smart audio systems, smart wear and other application fields; Industrial electronics cover the fields such as LAN IoT, WAN IoT and smart display.

As of 2021, it is the fourth largest mobile processor manufacturer in the world, after Mediatek, Qualcomm and Apple, with 9% of global market share.

Other companies
Phytium Technology
Loongson Technology
Jiangnan Computing Lab (Sunway)
Alibaba Group (Yitian)
GigaDevice
OmniVision Technologies 
GalaxyCore
Smartsens
Moore Threads
Jingjia Micro
Horizon Robotics
Cambricon

Outsourced Semiconductor Assembly and Test (OSAT)

JCET

JCET Group Co., Ltd. is a public company headquartered in Jiangyin on China's eastern coast. It is the largest Outsourced Semiconductor Assembly and Test (OSAT) company in mainland China and the third-largest globally. JCET was formed in 1972, when Jiangyin converted a local factory to produce transistors. JCET went public on the Shanghai Stock Exchange in 2003 and continued to grow over time. JCET provides a range of semiconductor packaging, assembly, manufacturing, and testing products and services.

Other companies
Huatian Technology
Tongfu Microelectronics

Semiconductor equipment manufacturers

Shanghai Micro Electronics Equipment (SMEE)
Shanghai Micro Electronics Equipment (SMEE) is a semiconductor manufacturing equipment manufacturer based in Shanghai, supplying lithography (DUV immersion) equipment and other equipment used in the semiconductor manufacturing industry. Currently, its most advanced product is the SSA600, with a resolution of 90 nm. SMEE is developing the SSA800, with a resolution of 28 nm, which will be followed up by the SSA900, with a resolution of 22 nm. In December 2022, the United States Department of Commerce added SMEE to the Bureau of Industry and Security's Entity List.

China Electronics Technology Group (CETC)
China Electronics Technology Group Corporation (CETC) is China's third largest electronics and IT company behind only Huawei and Lenovo. Its fields include communications equipment, computers, electronic equipment, IT infrastructure, networks, software development, research services, investment and asset management for civilian and military applications.

The company also manufactures semiconductors and semiconductor equipment used in the semiconductor manufacturing industry, largely for military applications.

Other companies
Advanced Micro-Fabrication Equipment Inc. China (AMEC)
NAURA Technology Group Co., Ltd.
China Resources Microelectronics Limited (CR Micro)

Other developments

Huawei
Huawei is reportedly planning to build its own fabs, in cooperation with SMIC, in an attempt to promote vertical integration and reduce impacts of sanctions.

See also
Semiconductor industry
Semiconductor industry in Taiwan
Semiconductor industry in India
Economy of China
Industry of China

Notes

References

Semiconductor industry by country
Industry in China
Semiconductor device fabrication